Bridget Catherine Regan (born February 3, 1982) is an American actress known for portrayals such as Kahlan Amnell in the television series Legend of the Seeker, Rebecca Lowe / Rachel Turner in White Collar, Rose Solano in Jane the Virgin, and Dottie Underwood in Agent Carter. She portrayed Sasha Cooper on the TNT drama series The Last Ship from 2016 to 2018.

Early life and education 
Born in Carlsbad, California, Bridget Catherine Regan grew up in an Irish American family and was raised Catholic. She had an interest in acting from a young age, and began acting as a child in North County productions of The Wizard of Oz at the La Paloma Theatre and Joseph and the Amazing Technicolor Dreamcoat in Carlsbad. 

Regan attended University of North Carolina School of the Arts, graduating with a BFA in drama in 2004. After college, she moved to New York City to pursue a professional acting career.

Career
Since 2006, Regan has appeared in various television shows and in films. In 2008, she began filming Legend of the Seeker, a television show based on Terry Goodkind's Sword of Truth series. She portrayed Mother Confessor Kahlan Amnell, which earned her a cult following. A natural redhead, Regan dyed her hair brown for the role. In 2009, she ventured into producing with Camp Wanatachi, a musical that ran in New York at La MaMa Experimental Theatre Club.

Regan was cast as a lead for the proposed television series The Frontier in 2012.

In 2013, she began a recurring role in the fifth season of the USA Network crime drama White Collar as Rebecca Lowe/Rachel Turner, a brief love interest of Neal Caffrey. That same year, she joined the series Beauty & the Beast for a multi-episode arc as Alex, the ex-fiancée of Vincent Keller (Jay Ryan).

In 2014, Regan was cast in a recurring role in Jane the Virgin, as Rose, a former lawyer, later criminal mastermind, who is involved in a complicated same-sex love affair. Also that year, she had a small role in John Wick, as Addy.

In 2014, Regan was cast in the recurring role of Dottie for 2015 in the comic book-based television series Agent Carter.

In 2016, Regan was added to the cast of the TNT drama series The Last Ship for the show's third season, playing the role of Sasha Cooper, a current diplomat in Asia and a former Navy Intelligence Officer.

In 2021, Regan was cast as Poison Ivy in the third season of The CW drama series Batwoman.

In 2022, Regan appeared on The Wayne Ayers Podcast.

Personal life
Regan is married to Eamon O'Sullivan, a writer she met in New Zealand while filming Legend of the Seeker. They have a daughter (born 2010) and a son (born 2018).

Regan is popular with the comic book community. From 2009 to 2013, she was commonly selected among comic book fans and critics as their ideal choice to portray Wonder Woman.

Filmography

Film

Television

Theatre

References

External links

 
 
 
 

1982 births
20th-century American actresses
21st-century American actresses
Actresses from San Diego
American film actresses
American people of Irish descent
American stage actresses
American television actresses
American theatre managers and producers
Living people
University of North Carolina School of the Arts alumni
People from Carlsbad, California